The 1984 Dutch TT was the eighth round of the 1984 Grand Prix motorcycle racing season. It took place on the weekend of 29–30 June 1984 at the TT Circuit Assen located in Assen, Netherlands.

Classification

500 cc

References

Dutch TT
Dutch
Tourist Trophy
Dutch TT